Henry Herbert Williams CH (19 December 1872 – 29 September 1961) was born into an ecclesiastical family on 19 December 1872 and educated at St Peter's School, York and The Queen's College, Oxford. He began his ministry in 1900 as a tutor and lecturer in philosophy at Hertford College, Oxford and in 1913 he became Principal of St Edmund Hall, Oxford. From 1920 to 1941 he was Bishop of Carlisle. He died on 29 September 1961.

References

External links

 

1872 births
Clergy from York
People educated at St Peter's School, York
Alumni of The Queen's College, Oxford
Principals of St Edmund Hall, Oxford
Bishops of Carlisle
20th-century Church of England bishops
Members of the Order of the Companions of Honour
1961 deaths